Komárno - Komárom fortification system is a system of forts, bastions, and fortifications in and around the towns of Komárno and Komárom (they were one town until the treaty of Trianon) on the banks of both the Danube and Váh rivers. The fortification system of town Komárno is the biggest fortification in Slovakia, and as a whole complex with fortifications on the Hungarian side of the Danube it is the biggest fortification in former Austro-Hungarian Empire.

Components 
 The central Fortress of Komárno at the confluence of Danube and Váh rivers: 
 Old Fortress strengthened after the Mongol Invasion in 1242.
 New Fortress built from 1658.
City fortifications (with 16 large bastions and interconnecting walls):
 Palatinus Line
 Váh Line
 Váh bridge-head on the left bank of Váh (and Danube).
 Fort Monostor (Fort Sandberg) in Komárom on the right bank of Danube.
 Fort Csillag (the Star Fort, csillag meaning "star" in Hungarian language)
 Fort Igmánd

Pictures

See also 
 Klapka Induló

External sources 
  UNESCO: System of Fortifications at the Confluence of the Rivers Danube and Váh in Komárno - Komárom

Buildings and structures in Komárno
Komárom
Forts in Slovakia
Forts in Hungary